Zaton is a rural locality (a settlement) in Solikamsky District, Perm Krai, Russia. The population was 508 as of 2010. There are 10 streets.

Geography 
Zaton is located 25 km north of Solikamsk (the district's administrative centre) by road. Verkhneye Moshevo is the nearest rural locality.

References 

Rural localities in Solikamsky District